Tan Sri Richard Lind (1922/3 – March 10, 2021) was Sabah State Secretary who was responsible for the erection of Keningau Oath Stone, a monument in Sabah, Malaysia.

Books 
 My Sabah: Reminiscences of a Former State Secretary, (2003)

References

External links 
 My Sabah: Reminiscences of a Former State Secretary

1920s births
2021 deaths
Year of birth uncertain
People from Sabah